Alpine Skiing at the 1980 Winter Olympics consisted of six alpine skiing events.  The races were held February 14–23 at Whiteface Mountain in Wilmington, New York, northeast of host 

This was the first Olympics in which the women's giant slalom consisted of two runs, rather than one, and both GS events ran only one run per day. This was the last Olympics which also served as World Championships for alpine skiing.

Medal summary
Eight nations won medals in Alpine skiing, with Liechtenstein leading the medal table, winning two gold, and two silver. Hanni Wenzel led the individual medal table, finishing on the podium in all three women's events, with two gold and one silver. Ingemar Stenmark was the leading male medalist, with two golds.

Wenzel's two gold medals were the first, and to date , only, won by Liechtenstein at the Olympics.

Medal table

Source:

Men's events

Source:

Women's events

Source:

Course information

Participating nations
Thirty nations sent alpine skiers to compete in the events in Lake Placid. China, Costa Rica and Cyprus made their Olympic alpine skiing debuts. Below is a list of the competing nations; in parentheses are the number of national competitors.

World championships
From 1948 through these Olympics in 1980, the alpine skiing events at the Winter Olympics also served as the World Championships, held every two years.  With the addition of the giant slalom, the combined event was dropped for 1950 and 1952, but returned as a World Championship event in 1954 as a "paper race" which used the results from the three events. During the Olympics from 1956 through 1980, World Championship medals were awarded by the FIS for the combined event. The combined returned as a separate event at the World Championships in 1982 and at the Olympics in 1988.

Combined

Men's Combined

Downhill: 14 February, Giant Slalom: 18–19 February, Slalom: 22 February

Women's Combined

Downhill: 17 February, Giant Slalom: 20–21 February, Slalom: 23 February

See also
Alpine skiing at the 1980 Winter Paralympics

References

External links
FIS-Ski.com - results - 1980 Olympics - Lake Placid, NY, USA
FIS-Ski.com - results - 1980 World Championships - Lake Placid, NY, USA
Whiteface Mountain – official site

 
1980 Winter Olympics events
Alpine skiing at the Winter Olympics
Winter Olympics
Alpine skiing competitions in the United States
Skiing in New York (state)